McLennan is a town in northern Alberta, Canada.

Named after John K. McLennan, vice president of the Edmonton, Dunvegan and British Columbia Railway on what used to be a community known as Round Lake, the town lies on the southern shore of Kimiwan Lake (the Cree word for rain), and northwest of Winagami Lake. The large concentration of shorebirds and waterfowl and McLennan's informal nickname as the 'Bird Capital of Canada' is due to the nearby lakes creating an attraction for migratory birds.

Its Cathédrale Saint-Jean-Baptiste, dedicated to John the Baptist, and built in 1947 is the archiepiscopal see of the Metropolitan Roman Catholic Archdiocese of Grouard–McLennan.

Demographics 

In the 2016 Census of Population conducted by Statistics Canada, the Town of McLennan recorded a population of 701 living in 256 of its 296 total private dwellings, a  change from its 2011 population of 809.

The population of the Town of McLennan according to its 2017 municipal census is 791.

See also 
 List of communities in Alberta
 List of towns in Alberta

References

External links 
 

1944 establishments in Alberta
Towns in Alberta